Juan Pío Manzano Fajardo (1817–1901) was a Mexican physician and politician, who was born and died in Valladolid, Yucatán. He was governor of Yucatán from 1889 to 1890.

1817 births
1901 deaths
19th-century Mexican physicians
Governors of Yucatán (state)
Politicians from Yucatán (state)
People from Valladolid, Yucatán